Karumanaseri Narayanaiyer Ananthapadmanabhan (born 8 September 1969) is an Indian former first-class cricketer from the state of Kerala. He played for the India "A" national team in international cricket and for South Zone and Kerala in Indian domestic cricket. He is the former captain of Kerala state Ranji trophy team. He now serves as an umpire at the first-class level and officiates in all the major domestic cricket tournaments in India, including the Ranji Trophy and Indian Premier League. In August 2020, Ananthapadmanabhan was promoted to the International Panel of ICC Umpires.

Playing career 
Ananthapadmanabhan represented his state team Kerala and the South Zone in first-class and List A cricket in India. He also represent India "A" team in the international cricket. He was a right-arm leg spin bowler and was efficient in bowling leg break and googly. In his first-class career, Ananthapadmanabhan took 344 wickets from  the 105 matches he played. He also scored three hundreds, including a double century and thus played the role of an able all-rounder for his team. Ananthapadmanabhan enjoyed a very successful first-class career but could not go on to represent the national team India at the Test or ODI level, largely because his career coincided with the Indian leg spinner Anil Kumble. KN Anathapadamanabhan's miserable tale is one of the untold stories of Indian cricket.

Umpiring career 
Ananthapadmanabhan is now an umpire and he officiates in major domestic tournaments in India since 2008. During the 2015–16 Ranji Trophy, he went on to stand in the 2nd semi-final between Madhya Pradesh and Mumbai at Cuttack from 13 to 17 February 2016. He also officiated in matches in the 2016 Indian Premier League. During the 2016–17 Ranji Trophy, he was appointed to stand in the 2nd semi-final between Gujarat and Jharkhand at Nagpur from 1–5 January 2017. He stood in matches in the 2017 Indian Premier League.

In August 2020 he was elevated to the ICC panel of international umpires. He stood in his first Twenty20 International (T20I) match, between India and England on 12 March 2021. He stood in his first One Day International (ODI) match, also between India and England, on 23 March 2021.

See also
 List of One Day International cricket umpires
 List of Twenty20 International cricket umpires

References

External links 
 

1969 births
Living people
Kerala cricketers
South Zone cricketers
Indian cricketers
Indian cricket umpires
Indian One Day International cricket umpires
Indian Twenty20 International cricket umpires
Cricketers from Thiruvananthapuram